Huw Edwards (born 1961) is a Welsh journalist and newsreader who is the lead presenter of BBC News at Ten.

Huw Edwards may also refer to:

Huw T. Edwards (1892–1970), Welsh trade union leader and nationalist politician
Huw Edwards (politician) (born 1953), British Member of Parliament for Monmouth
Huw Edwards (conductor), Welsh conductor
Huw Edwards (EastEnders), fictional character

See also
Hugh Edwards (disambiguation)